The migration waves of Byzantine Greek scholars and émigrés in the period following the end of the Byzantine Empire in 1453 is considered by many scholars key to the revival of Greek studies that led to the development of the Renaissance humanism and science. These émigrés brought to Western Europe the relatively well-preserved remnants and accumulated knowledge of their own (Greek) civilization, which had mostly not survived the Early Middle Ages in the West. The Encyclopædia Britannica claims: "Many modern scholars also agree that the exodus of Greeks to Italy as a result of this event marked the end of the Middle Ages and the beginning of the Renaissance", although few scholars date the start of the Italian Renaissance this late.

History
The main role of Byzantine scholars within Renaissance humanism was the teaching of the Greek language to their western counterparts in universities or privately together with the spread of ancient texts. Their forerunners were Barlaam of Calabria (Bernardo Massari) and Leonzio Pilato, two translators who were both born in Calabria in southern Italy and who were both educated in the Greek language. The impact of these two scholars on the humanists was indisputable.

By 1500 there was a Greek-speaking community of about 5,000 in Venice. The Venetians also ruled Crete, Dalmatia, and scattered islands and port cities of the former empire, the populations of which were augmented by refugees from other Byzantine provinces who preferred Venetian to Ottoman governance. Crete was especially notable for the Cretan School of icon-painting, which after 1453 became the most important in the Greek world.

After the peak of the Italian Renaissance in the first decades of the 16th century, the flow of information reversed, and Greek scholars in Italy were employed to oppose Turkish expansion into former Byzantine lands in Greece, prevent the Protestant Reformation spreading there and help bring the Eastern Churches back into communion with Rome. In 1577, Gregory XIII founded the Collegio Pontifico Greco as a college in Rome to receive young Greeks belonging to any nation in which the Greek Rite was used, and consequently for Greek refugees in Italy as well as the Ruthenians and Malchites of Egypt and Syria. The construction of the College and Church of S. Atanasio, joined by a bridge over the Via dei Greci, was begun in that year.

Although ideas from ancient Rome already enjoyed popularity with the scholars of the 14th century and their importance to the Renaissance was undeniable, the lessons of Greek learning brought by Byzantine intellectuals changed the course of humanism and the Renaissance itself. While Greek learning affected all the subjects of the studia humanitatis, history and philosophy in particular were profoundly affected by the texts and ideas brought from Byzantium. History was changed by the re-discovery and spread of Greek historians’ writings, and this knowledge of Greek historical treatises helped the subject of history become a guide to virtuous living based on the study of past events and people. The effects of this renewed knowledge of Greek history can be seen in the writings of humanists on virtue, which was a popular topic. Specifically, these effects are shown in the examples provided from Greek antiquity that displayed virtue as well as vice.

The philosophy of not only Aristotle but also Plato affected the Renaissance by causing debates over man’s place in the universe, the immortality of the soul, and the ability of man to improve himself through virtue. The flourishing of philosophical writings in the 15th century revealed the impact of Greek philosophy and science on the Renaissance. The resonance of these changes lasted through the centuries following the Renaissance not only in the writing of humanists, but also in the education and values of Europe and western society even to the present day.

Deno Geanakopoulos in his work on the contribution of Byzantine Greek scholars to Renaissance has summarised their input into three major shifts to Renaissance thought: 
 in early 14th century Florence from the early, central emphasis on rhetoric to one on metaphysical philosophy by means of introducing and reinterpretation of the Platonic texts,
 in Venice-Padua by reducing the dominance of Averroist Aristotle in science and philosophy by supplementing but not completely replacing it with Byzantine traditions which utilised ancient and Byzantine commentators on Aristotle,
 and earlier in the mid 15th century in Rome, through emphasis not on any philosophical school but through the production of more authentic and reliable versions of Greek texts relevant to all fields of humanism and science and with respect to the Greek fathers of the church. Hardly less important was their direct or indirect influence on exegesis of the New Testament itself through Cardinal Bessarion's inspiration of Lorenzo Valla's biblical emendations of the Latin vulgate in the light of the Greek text.

Scholars
 Leo Allatius (c. 1586 – 1669), Rome, librarian of the library of Vatican
 George Amiroutzes (1400–1470), Florence, Aristotelian
 Henry Aristippus of Calabria (1105–10 – 1162)
 Michael Apostolius (c. 1420 – after 1474 or 1486), Rome
 Arsenius Apostolius (c. 1468 – 1538), Venice, bishop of Monemvasia
 John Argyropoulos (c. 1415 – 1487), Universities of Florence, Rome
 Simon Atumano (14th century), Bishop of Gerace in Calabria
 Bessarion (1403–1472), Catholic cardinal
 Barlaam of Seminara (c. 1290–1348), he taught Petrarch some rudiments of Greek language
 Zacharias Calliergi (fl. 1499–1515), Rome
 Laonicus Chalcocondyles (c. 1430 – c. 1470), historian, Athens
 Demetrius Chalcondyles (1423–1511), Padua, Florence, Milan
 Theofilos Chalcocondylis, Florence
 Manuel Chrysoloras (c. 1355 – 1415), Florence, Pavia, Rome, Venice, Milan
 John Chrysoloras, scholar and diplomat: relative of Manuel Chrysoloras, patron of Francesco Filelfo
 Andronicus Contoblacas, Basel, teacher of Johann Reuchlin
 Johannes Crastonis (d. after 1497), Modena, Greek-Latin dictionary
 Andronicus Callistus (1400 – c. 1476), Rome, Bologna, Florence, Paris, cousin of Theodorus Gaza
 Demetrius Cydones (1324–1398), Mesazon of the Byzantine Empire
 Mathew Devaris (fl. 1552–1550), Rome
 Demetrios Ducas (с. 1480 – c. 1527), Spain
 Elia del Medigo (c. 1458 – c. 1493), Venice, Rome, Padua, Jewish philosopher
 Antonios Eparchos (1491–1571), Venice, scholar and poet
 Antonio de Ferraris (c. 1444 – 1517), academic, doctor and humanist
 Theodorus Gaza (c. 1398 – c. 1475), first dean of the University of Ferrara, Naples and Rome
 George Gemistos Plethon (c. 1355/1360 – 1452/54), teacher of Bessarion
 George of Trebizond (1395–1486), Venice, Florence, Rome
 George Hermonymus (before 1435 – after 1503), University of Paris, teacher of Erasmus, Reuchlin, Budaeus and Jacques Lefèvre d'Étaples
 Georgios Kalafatis (ca. 1652 – ca. 1720), Greek professor of theoretical and practical medicine
 Andreas Musalus (ca. 1665/6 – ca. 1721), Greek professor of mathematics, philosopher and architectural theorist
 Nicholas Kalliakis (Nicolai Calliachius) (1645–1707), a Greek scholar and philosopher who flourished in Italy.
 Mathaeos Kamariotis (d. 1490), Constantinople
 Isidore of Kiev (1385–1463)
 Ioannis Kigalas (ca. 1622 – 1687), Greek scholar and professor of Philosophy and Logic
 Ioannis Kottounios (c. 1577 – 1658), Padua
 Konstantinos Kallokratos (b. 1589), Calabria
 Constantine Lascaris (1434–1501), University of Messina
 Janus Lascaris or Rhyndacenus (c. 1445 – 1535), Rome
 Leonard of Chios (c. 1395/96 – c. 1458), Greek-born Roman Catholic prelate
 Nikolaos Loukanis (16th century), Venice
 Maximus the Greek (c. 1475 – 1556) studied in Italy before moving to Russia
 Maximos Margunios (1549–1602), Venice
 Marcus Musurus (c. 1470 – 1517), University of Padua
 Michael Tarchaniota Marullus (с. 1458 – 1500), Ancona and Florence, friend and pupil of Jovianus Pontanus
 Leonardos Philaras (1595–1673), an early advocate for Greek independence
 Maximus Planudes (c. 1260 – c. 1305), Rome, Venice, anthologist, mathematician, grammarian, theologian
 Franciscus Portus (1511–1581), Venice, Ferrara, Geneva
 John Servopoulos (fl. 1484–1500), scholar, professor, Oxford
 Nikolaos Sophianos (c. 1500 – after 1551), Rome, Venice: scholar and geographer, creator of the Totius Graeciae Descriptio
 Nicholas Leonicus Thomaeus (1456–1531), Venice, Padua
 Iakovos Trivolis (d. 1547), Venice
 Gregory Tifernas (1414–1462), Paris, teacher of Jacques Lefèvre d'Étaples and Robert Gaguin
 Gerasimos Vlachos (1607–1685), Venice
 Francesco Maurolico (1494–1575), mathematician and astronomer from Sicily

Painting and music

 Marco Basaiti (c. 1470 – c. 1530), painter, Venice
 Belisario Corenzio (c. 1558–1643), painter, Napoli
 Michael Damaskenos (1530/35–1592/93), Venice, Cretan painter
 Georgios Klontzas (1535-1608) Cretan painter
 Thomas Flanginis (1578–1648), Venice, funded the establishment of the Flanginian Greek school for teachers
 El Greco (1541–1614), the nickname for the Cretan painter Dominikos Theotokopoulos, Italy, Spain
 Francisco Leontaritis (1518 – c. 1572), Italy, Bavaria: singer and composer
 Anna Notaras (d. 1507), Venice, first Greek printing press
 Angelos Pitzamanos (1467–1535), Cretan painter, Otranto, Southern Italy
 Janus Plousiadenos (c. 1429 – c. 1500), Venice, hymnographer and composer
 Theodore Poulakis (1622–1692), Venice, painter
 Emmanuel Tzanes (1610–1690), Venice, Cretan painter
 John Rhosos (d. 1498), Rome, Venice well-known scribe
 Antonio Vassilacchi (1556–1629), painter from Milos worked in Venice with Paolo Veronese

See also
 Byzantine art
 Cretan School
 Byzantine science
 French humanism, a movement influenced by Greek scholar working in France
 Greek College
 List of Byzantine scholars
 Renaissance humanism

References

Sources
 Deno J. Geanakoplos, Byzantine East and Latin West: Two worlds of Christendom in Middle Ages and renaissance. The Academy Library Harper & Row Publishers, New York, 1966.
 Deno J. Geanakoplos, (1958) A Byzantine looks at the renaissance, Greek, Roman and Byzantine Studies 1 (2);pp:157-62.
 Jonathan Harris, Greek Émigrés in the West, 1400-1520, Camberley: Porphyrogenitus, 1995.
 Louise Ropes Loomis (1908) The Greek Renaissance in Italy The American Historical Review, 13(2);pp:246-258.
 John Monfasani Byzantine Scholars in Renaissance Italy: Cardinal Bessarion and Other Émigrés: Selected Essays, Aldershot, Hampshire: Variorum, 1995.
 Steven Runciman, The fall of Constantinople, 1453. Cambridge University press, Cambridge 1965.
 Fotis Vassileiou & Barbara Saribalidou, Short Biographical Lexicon of Byzantine Academics Immigrants to Western Europe, 2007.
 Dimitri Tselos (1956) A Greco-Italian School of Illuminators and Fresco Painters: Its Relation to the Principal Reims
 Nigel G. Wilson. From Byzantium to Italy: Greek Studies in the Italian Renaissance.'' Baltimore: Johns Hopkins University Press, 1992.

External links
 Greece: Books and Writers.
 Michael D. Reeve, "On the role of Greek in Renaissance scholarship.'
 Jonathan Harris, 'Byzantines in Renaissance Italy'. 
 Bilingual (Greek original / English) excerpts from Gennadios Scholarios' Epistle to Orators.
 Paul Botley, Renaissance Scholarship and the Athenian Calendar.
 Richard C. Jebb 'Christian Renaissance'.
 Karl Krumbacher: 'The History of Byzantine Literature: from Justinian to the end of the Eastern Roman Empire (527-1453)'.
 San Giorgio dei Greci and the Greek community of Venice
 Istituto Ellenico di Studi Byzantini and Postbyzantini di Venezia

Byzantine science
Renaissance

Scholars
Renaissance humanism
Greece–Italy relations